Microsoft Notification Protocol (MSNP, also known as the Mobile Status Notification Protocol) is an instant messaging protocol developed by Microsoft for use by the Microsoft Messenger service and the instant messaging clients that connect to it, such as Skype since 2014, and the earlier Windows Live Messenger, MSN Messenger, Windows Messenger, and Microsoft Messenger for Mac. Third-party clients such as Pidgin and Trillian can also communicate using the protocol. MSNP was first used in a publicly available product with the first release of MSN Messenger in 1999.

Technical details 
Any major change made to the protocol, such as a new command or syntax changes, results in a version-number incremented by one in the format of MSNP#. During October 2003, Microsoft started blocking access to Messenger service using versions below MSNP8.

Starting on September 11, 2007, Microsoft forces most current users of MSN Messenger to upgrade to Windows Live Messenger 8.1 due to security considerations.

Version history

MSNP1
MSNP1 has never been public. It is believed it was used during the early stages of design and development with MSN Messenger 1

MSNP2
A pre-release version was made available to developers in 1999 in an Internet Draft. However, the production version differed from the published version in a few subtle ways.

MSNP3
Both MSNP2 and MSNP3 were supported by MSN Messenger 2.0

MSNP4 and MSNP5
MSNP3, 4, and 5 were supported by the Messenger servers by July 2000  and used by MSN Messenger 3.0 and 4.0.

MSNP6 and MSNP7
MSNP6 was used by later versions of MSN Messenger 4.x. In 2002 MSN Messenger 5.0 used MSNP7.

MSNP8
MSNP8 introduced a different authentication method, now sending authorization to Microsoft Passport's secure servers and returning a challenge string. It is the minimum version of the protocol accepted by .NET Messenger Service after Microsoft blocked earlier versions for security reasons. As such, old and obsolete clients are unable to sign in, forcing users to upgrade clients.

Version 5.0 of MSN Messenger is the only one that uses this MSNP version. Windows Messenger uses MSNP8 as its standard version, including 4.7 up to the latest 5.1.

This protocol supports Windows Messenger-to-Windows Messenger webcam and voice capabilities.

MSNP9
MSNP9 was introduced with MSN Messenger 6, adding support for "D type" (data) messages, which are used for transferring display pictures and custom emoticons between clients, frame-by-frame web cam (rather than a traditional stream like Windows Media Player's WMV format) and an improved voice system, as well as improved NAT traversal for file transfers.

MSNP10
Employed in MSN Messenger 6.1, after Microsoft started blocking earlier versions in October 2003. However, it was not a big overhaul, the only obvious change was integration with Hotmail address books.

MSNP11
Employed by MSN Messenger 7.0

MSNP12
Employed by MSN Messenger 7.5.

MSNP13
Employed by Windows Live Messenger 8.0, MSNP13 features a lot of changes. Most notably, contact list synchronization has been removed and clients must instead send a SOAP request to a contacts server, also known as "Client goes to ABCH" (where ABCH stands for Address Book Clearing House, the address book service behind all MSN and Windows Live services). The client must then send the contacts data to the server for it to send presence information.

MSNP14
MSNP14 adds Yahoo! Messenger interoperability.

MSNP15
MSNP15 is the protocol version introduced with Windows Live Messenger 8.1 on 2006-09-08. It is based on MSNP14 but uses a different authentication mechanism called RPS (Relying Party Suite). Where TWN "Tweener" authentication is used on protocol versions 14 and below, SSO (Single Sign-On; RPS) authentication will be used on protocol versions 15 and above.

In addition to a new authentication mechanism, Microsoft is also planning on making more of the properties of the user roaming. That is, the user's display picture, and in the future personal status messages, will be the same wherever the user signs in.

Furthermore, support for user locations has been added to the Personal Status Message, although this feature was later removed from the Windows Live Messenger 8.1 client.

MSNP16
MSNP16 is used in a pre-release version of Windows Live Messenger 9.0, leaked in December 2007.

It features "Multiple Points of Presence" (MPOP), the ability to sign in at 2 places at the same time with having chats replicated at all places. The UUX data have been extended to contain Endpoint Data (also MPOP), as well as Signature Sound MSN Object Data.

MSNP17
MSNP17 is identified by Windows Live Messenger servers on messenger.hotmail.com, but unused by any official client released by Microsoft.

MSNP18
MSNP18 is used in Windows Live Messenger 2009 (14.0). Its main new addition is the Groups feature, much like persistent grouped conversations. UUX Data have been extended to include Scene image MSN Object data.

MSNP19
Employed by Windows Live Messenger 2011 (Wave 4)

MSNP21
Employed by Windows Live Messenger 2012

MSNP24
Employed by Skype since early 2014. Also used by Microsoft Teams.

See also
Microsoft Messenger service
Apple Push Notification Service
iMessage
Comparison of instant messaging protocols

References

External links
MSN Messenger Protocol - Protocol documentation
MSNPiki - Protocol wiki
MZK - A PHP library that implements the MSN protocol
MSNP-Sharp - A dotnet library implements the MSN protocol
WSDL & XSD files - Web Service Definitions and Schemas
 MSNP15 authentication scheme REd
Java MSN library - Supports protocol 8 to 15
MSNp.py MSN messaging in Python

Instant messaging protocols
Microsoft server technology